Ivana Dežić (born 27 July 1994) is a Croatian handball player for ESBF Besançon and the Croatian national team.

She participated at the 2018 European Women's Handball Championship.

References

External links

1994 births
Living people
Sportspeople from Varaždin
Croatian female handball players
Expatriate handball players in Poland
Croatian expatriate sportspeople  in Poland
RK Podravka Koprivnica players
21st-century Croatian women